Jonathan Glover (born 1941) is a British philosopher known for his books and studies on ethics. He currently teaches ethics at King's College London. Glover is a fellow of the Hastings Center, an independent bioethics research institution in the United States, and is a Distinguished Research Fellow at the Oxford Uehiro Centre for Practical Ethics.

Education
Glover was educated at Tonbridge School, later going on to Corpus Christi College, Oxford. He was a fellow and tutor in philosophy at New College, Oxford, and is now a Distinguished Research Fellow at the Oxford Uehiro Centre for Practical Ethics.

Career
Glover's book Causing Death and Saving Lives, first published in 1977, addresses practical moral questions about life and death decisions in the areas of abortion, infanticide, suicide, euthanasia, choices between people, capital punishment, and issues of war and peace. His approach is broadly consequentialist (utilitarian), though he gives significant weight to questions of individual autonomy, the Kantian notion that we ought to treat other people as ends in themselves rather than merely as means. He criticises the idea that time periods of mere consciousness or life itself are intrinsically valuable: these states matter, he argues, because they are pre-requisites for other things that are valuable and make for a life worth living. There is, then, no absolute sanctity of human life. He criticises the principle of double effect, as well as the acts and omissions doctrine, specifically the notion that there is a huge moral difference between killing someone and intentionally letting them die.  He also draws on insights from history and literature, not just strictly from philosophy. On the topic of 20th century war and moral distance, he writes, "There is the feeling that because killing at a distance is easier, one would not have to be such a monster to do it." Throughout, the emphasis is on the consequences of moral choices for those affected, rather than on abstract principles applied impersonally.

In Humanity: A Moral History of the Twentieth Century, published in 1999, Glover considers the psychological factors that predispose us to commit barbaric acts, and suggests how man-made moral traditions and the cultivation of moral imagination can work to restrain us from a ruthlessly selfish treatment of others. Gaining greater understanding of the monsters within us, he argues, is part of the process of caging and containing them. He examines the various types of atrocity that were perpetrated in the 20th century, including Nazi genocide, communist mass killings under Stalin, Mao, and Pol Pot, and more recent slaughter in Bosnia and Rwanda, and examines what sort of bulwarks there could be against them. He allows that religion has provided bulwarks, which are getting eroded. He identifies three types of bulwark. The two more dependable are sympathy and respect for human dignity. The less dependable third is Moral Identity: "I belong to a kind of person who would not do that sort of thing". This third is less dependable because notions of moral identity can themselves be warped, as was done by the Nazis.

In The End of Faith: Religion, Terror, and the Future of Reason, Sam Harris quotes Glover as saying: "Our entanglements with people close to us erode simple self-interest.  Husbands, wives, lovers, parents, children and friends all blur the boundaries of selfish concern.  Francis Bacon rightly said that people with children have given hostages to fortune.  Inescapably, other forms of friendship and love hold us hostage too...Narrow self-interest is destabilized."

In 1989, the European Commission hired Glover to head a panel on embryo research and assisted reproduction.

In 2018, Glover was awarded the Dan David Prize for his work in bioethics.

Bibliography

Books 

B

Book chapters

References

Further reading

Davis, N. Ann; Keshen, Richard; McMahan, Jeff. (eds) (2010). Ethics and Humanity: Themes From the Philosophy of Jonathan Glover. Oxford University Press.
Scialabba, George. "Oh, the humanity reflecting on the 20th century's horrors – with understanding and some hope" . Boston Globe. 22 October 2000.
Tharoor, Shashi. "Guns, Rights and People...". Los Angeles Times. 17 September 2000. Accessed 6 August 2011.
Pinker, Steven. "All About Evil ". The New York Times. 29 October 2000. Accessed 6 August 2011.
Review of Humanity: A Moral History of the 20th Century by Margaret Urban Walker . The Journal of Value Inquiry 36 (1): 119–123. 2002. .
Lanigan, John. "Choosing Children by Jonathan Glover". Philosophy Now. 2006. Accessed 6 August 2011. Archived 5 August 2011.

External links
Jonathan Glover's website
King's College Page on Glover

1941 births
20th-century British philosophers
21st-century British philosophers
British abortion-rights activists
Living people
Academics of King's College London
Fellows of New College, Oxford
Fellows of King's College London
People educated at Tonbridge School
Alumni of Corpus Christi College, Oxford
Utilitarians
Hastings Center Fellows
Bioethicists